David Drake (c. 1800 – c. 1870s), also known as "Dave Pottery" and "Dave the Potter," was an American potter and enslaved African American who lived in Edgefield, South Carolina. Drake lived and worked in Edgefield for almost all his life.

Drake produced alkaline-glazed stoneware jugs between the 1820s and the 1870s. An enslaved African American, he often signed his works "Dave." He is recognized as the first enslaved potter to inscribe his work, during a time when most enslaved people were illiterate, often forbidden from literacy, and anonymous. Drake inscribed his work with poetry, often using rhyming couplets, as well as his signature.

Life
David Drake is thought to have been born the first half of the year 1800 on a plantation in South Carolina, enslaved by the Drake family. The first legal record of Drake is a description from June 13, 1818, that describes "a boy about 17 years old country born" who was "mortgaged to Eldrid Simkins by Harvey Drake". "Country born" refers to an enslaved African American who was born in the United States rather than Africa. During the antebellum period, Drake was one of the 76 known enslaved African American to have worked in Edgefield's twelve pottery factories.

David Drake was first enslaved by Harvey Drake. Harvey Drake owned a large pottery business with his business partner Abner Landrum. Drake is believed to have been born to one of eight slaves that Landrum had brought to Edgefield from North Carolina. This pottery business, and the area within which David Drake worked, is known as Pottersville. Landrum was the publisher of a local newspaper called The Edgefield Hive. It is unclear how Drake learned to read and write. Scholars speculate he was taught by Landrum, who was known to be a religious man and may have taught Drake how to read the Bible. During this time period it was punishable for enslaved people to be literate, especially in South Carolina. Most southern states in the early 1800s restricted black literacy, and in 1830s legislation was passed laws prohibiting their education. South Carolina's Negro Act of 1740, prohibited teaching enslaved Africans to read and write, punishable by a fine of 100 pounds and six months in prison. Another unclear detail about Drake's life is his missing leg. At an unknown point in his life, one of Drake's legs was amputated; it is speculated that Drake lost his leg after his owner severely beat Drake for inscribing his works.

After the death of Harvey Drake, David Drake was enslaved by Rev. John Landrum. In 1846, Rev. Landrum passed away and all eighteen of the people he enslaved were put up for sale. Drake was then purchased and enslaved by Rev. Landrum's son, Franklin Landrum. Drake's treatment under Franklin Landrum was poor. During the period of his enslavement by Franklin Lundrum, Drake's wares were not inscribed and no poetry is thought to have been produced.

In 1849, Lewis Miles bought and enslaved Drake. During the time Drake produced his largest amount of wares that included poetry. Miles' factory was known as 'Stony Bluff.' Drake's poetry at this time increased from one every few years to three in 1857, eight in 1858, and seven in 1859.

At the end of the Civil War, Drake was a free man and it is thought he took the surname "Drake" from his first owner Harvey Drake. The name "David Drake" is recorded in the 1870 United States Census as "David Drake, Turner." It is thought that Drake died in the 1870s, as the names "David Drake" nor "Dave Drake" do not appear in the 1880 census.

Pottery and work

Drake's earliest recorded work is a pot dated July 12, 1834. The poetry on this vessel reads:

Drake scholar Jill Beute Koverman argues that Drake "made more than 40,000 pieces over his lifetime." Twenty of Drake's jars and jugs are inscribed with original poetry and fifty additional vessels reveal his signature, maker's mark, date, and other inscriptions. Drake's jars are bulbous in form, similar to most ware produced in antebellum Edgefield. One marker of Drake's work is that his jars are widest at the top - 
One of Drake's better known pieces, a 19-inch greenware pot, is dated back to August 16, 1857, includes the following description:

Drake commonly used  jugs, which he frequently adorned with short poems and couplets below the rim of the jar. Some of these were explanatory "Put every bit all between / surely this jar will hold 14;" and some, like the one above, were commentaries on the institution of slavery. The well known inscription, "I wonder where is all my relations / Friendship to all—and every nation," demonstrates Drake questioning his heritage and personal history. This contemplation signifies Drake's positivity despite facing the many brutalities of slavery, including the loss of personal identity. It is believed that the inscriptions Drake included on his works were used as a method of personal expression, communication with other slaves, and even defiance to the institution of slavery. Some collectors and scholars have suggested that Drake's poetry should be characterized as an early act of sedition in the cause of civil rights, because at the time it was generally forbidden for African-Americans to read and write. Pieces by Drake frequently feature the initials "LM." This stood for Lewis Miles, the man who owned the pottery workshop where Drake worked (Miles may have enslaved Dave for a time, starting in the late 1830s). Lewis Miles has even been referenced directly in one of Drake's couplets: "Dave belongs to Mr. Miles / Wher the oven bakes & the pot biles."

Legacy 

In 2010, the children's book Dave the Potter: Artist, Poet, Slave was written by Laban Carrick Hill and illustrated by Bryan Collier. The book gives a biography of Drake as well as his prowess for creating pottery. It won the Coretta Scott King Award and was a Caldecott Honor book in 2011.

In 2013 author Andrea Cheng published the middle grade novel Etched in Clay: The Life of Dave, Enslaved Potter and Poet offering a biographical look at Drake's life.

During Drake's lifetime, his pots were worth around 50 cents; However today, they sell for as much as $50,000. In contemporary auctions and sales, his work has sold for over $40,000 per piece.

In 2012, one of Drake's pieces, a butter churn with the inscription, "This is a noble churn / fill it up it will never turn," sold for $130,000 at a Charlton Hall Auction in South Carolina.

In 2020 an attributed inscription jar sold for $369,000 at a Brunk's Auction in Asheville, North Carolina.

In 2008 Leonard Todd published a cohesive biography on Drake. Leonard Todd's interest lies in the fact that two of his ancestors enslaved Drake at some point in time.

The 1998 exhibition The Life and Works of the Enslaved African American Potter, Dave at University of South Carolina's McKissick Museum was the first exhibition devoted solely to Drake's pottery. In 2010 contemporary artist Theaster Gates created an exhibition responding to and centering around the work of David Drake, titled Theaster Gates: To Speculate Darkly at the Milwaukee Art Museum. In this exhibition Gates used Drake's work to address issues of craft and race in African American history.

In 2016 an exhibition at the Vero Museum of Art titled David Drake: Potter and Poet contained 31 objects; 13 of which are known to be from Drake's hand.

Collections

Drake's work is in the permanent collections of the Smithsonian's National Museum of American History and the National Gallery of Art in Washington, the Philadelphia Museum of Art, the Museum of Fine Arts, Boston, the Art Institute of Chicago, the De Young Museum in San Francisco, the Saint Louis Art Museum, the Metropolitan Museum of Art, the International African American Museum in Charleston, South Carolina, the Southern Collection of the Greenville County Museum of Art (Greenville, SC), and the McKissick Museum at the University of South Carolina.

See also
List of enslaved people

References

External links

American potters
African-American artists
19th-century American slaves
1800s births
1870s deaths
People from Edgefield County, South Carolina
19th-century American artists
African-American potters
African-American ceramists